Clinics in Endocrinology and Metabolism was a scientific journal in the field of endocrinology.

Publications established in 1972
Publications disestablished in 1986
Endocrinology journals
Elsevier academic journals